Peter Lundy and the Medicine Hat Stallion is a television movie starring Leif Garrett which aired November 6, 1977 on NBC. It is based on the novel San Domingo, The Medicine Hat Stallion by Newbery Medal award winner Marguerite Henry. The movie was developed and produced by Ed Friendly and directed by Michael O'Herlihy from a teleplay by Jack Turley.  In 1978 Peter Lundy was awarded the Bronze Wrangler for Outstanding Western Fictional Television Program by the National Cowboy & Western Heritage Museum.

Summary
Peter Lundy (Leif Garrett) is a 15-year-old boy growing up in pre-Civil War Nebraska Territory with his father Jethro (played by Mitchell Ryan), mother Emily (played by Bibi Besch), and Grandma Lundy (played by Ann Doran).  Peter resents the tyrannical way his father treats him and hates the bleak life at their prairie trading post. He raises a foal that was left at the trading post as a payment until it becomes old enough to ride.  Peter and his horse then win a job with the Pony Express to carry correspondence and messages between the East and West coasts. It is a rough, hard, and dangerous job but Peter learns what he is made of and earns the respect of his father.

Cast

 Leif Garrett as Peter Lundy
 Milo O'Shea as Brisly
 Bibi Besch as Emily Lundy
 John Quade as Adam
 Ann Doran as Grandma Lundy
 Brad Rearden as Jim Baxter
 Mitchell Ryan as Jethro Lundy
 John Anderson as Alexander Majors
 Charles Tyner as Lefty Slade
 Ned Romero as Red Cloud
 Jimmy Lydon as Muggeridge
 Phil Mead as Hugo Rummelholf
 Bill Hicks as Bolivar Roberts
 Robert Tzudiker as Pee Wee

Awards
Won
 Western Heritage Awards Bronze Wrangler (1978) for Fictional Television Drama - Film/Television
Ed Friendly, Producer
Michael O'Herlihy, Director
Jack Turley, Writer
Leif Garrett, Actor
Milo O'Shea, Actor

Nomination
 Primetime Emmy Award (1978)
Outstanding Children's Special – Ed Friendly (producer)

Other Awards
 Film Advisory Board Award of Excellence
 Southern California Motion Picture Council Golden Halo
 American Humane Association Award for outstanding contribution to the production of a motion picture with animals.

References

External links
 Peter Lundy and the Medicine Hat Stallion, Internet Movie Database (IMDB.com)
 San Domingo, The Medicine Hat Stallion, Archive.org
 National Cowboy and Western Heritage Museum 
 Southern California Motion Picture Council Golden Halo Awards
 Marguerite Henry New York Times Obituary
 Ed Friendly's Life and Legacy (littlehouseontheprairie.com)

Films directed by Michael O'Herlihy